Johnny Harold Leverón Uclés (born 7 February 1990) is a Honduran international footballer who plays for Olimpia in the Liga Nacional de Fútbol de Honduras.

Career

Club
In December 2008, he signed for F.C. Motagua, and played with the Honduran club until 2012. Leverón made his official debut in the Honduran league on 19 April 2009 with Motagua in the 3–6 defeat against Marathón in San Pedro Sula. While with Motagua he appeared in 83 league matches and scored nine goals.

In January 2013 it was revealed his agent was looking for a move abroad. In February 2013 he signed a contract to play in MLS for Vancouver Whitecaps FC.

In 2015 Levenón signed for Mexican Ascenso MX team, Correcaminos UAT.

International
Leverón represented Honduras in the 2007 Pan American Games in Rio Janeiro. He was captain of the under 17 team and scored three goals for his squad. He also played in the 2007 FIFA U-17 World Cup in Korea and at the 2009 FIFA U-20 World Cup in Egypt.

He made his senior debut for Honduras in an April 2010 friendly match against Venezuela and has, as of January 2013, earned a total of 22 caps, scoring 3 goals. He has represented his country in one FIFA World Cup qualification match and played at the 2012 Summer Olympics. He also played at the 2011 UNCAF Nations Cups as well as at the 2011 CONCACAF Gold Cup.

Career statistics

International goals

Honours and awards

F.C. Motagua
Liga Profesional de Honduras: 2010–11 C
C.D. Marathón
Liga Profesional de Honduras: 2017–18 C

Honduras
Copa Centroamericana: 2011

References

External links

1990 births
Living people
People from Yoro Department
Association football defenders
Honduran footballers
Honduran expatriate footballers
Honduras international footballers
Olympic footballers of Honduras
Footballers at the 2012 Summer Olympics
Footballers at the 2007 Pan American Games
2011 Copa Centroamericana players
2011 CONCACAF Gold Cup players
2014 Copa Centroamericana players
2015 CONCACAF Gold Cup players
2021 CONCACAF Gold Cup players
F.C. Motagua players
Vancouver Whitecaps FC players
C.D. Marathón players
Liga Nacional de Fútbol Profesional de Honduras players
Expatriate soccer players in Canada
Major League Soccer players
Copa Centroamericana-winning players
2009 CONCACAF U-20 Championship players
Pan American Games competitors for Honduras
C.D. Olimpia players